Patricia Rivadeneira Ruiz-Tagle (Santiago, August 6, 1964) is an actress and a cultural manager from Chile.  She was Chilean Cultural Attaché in Italy by the government of Ricardo Lagos Escobar, a job she carried out between 2001 and 2006. Between 2007 and 2011, the actress served as Executive Secretary of the Instituto Italo – Latino Americano (IILA). For her contribution to culture, she was decorated by the Italian Government with the Order of the Star of Italy.
She is considered a muse of the avant-garde in Chile.

In the 90s she stood out on TVN with her characters in telenovelas such as Trampas y caretas, Sucupira and Aquelarre. She then she returned after 15 years and she belongs to the Dramatic Area of Mega where she shines in the late night soap operas.

Filmography

Films

Telenovela

TV Series

Theater 
Plays
 Réplica (2018) de Isidora Stevenson
 Xuárez (2015) de Luis Barrales
 Allende, noche de septiembre (2013) de Luis Barrales
 La contadora de películas (2013–2014) de Donatello Salamina.
 Un’Altra Fame (2007) de Diego Muñoz y Michela Andreozzi
 Déjala sangrar (2006) de Benjamín Galemiri
 Intendevo dire (2005) de Craig Lucas
 Neruda, 100 años, recital poético (2004) con el Grupo Chiloé y Alessandro Haber
 Aprenderás de nuevo a ser estrella (2004) recital poético con Leo Gulotta
 Recital Poético, Neruda (2004) con Mariano Rigillo, Festival de Ravello
 EI Amor Intelectual (1999) de Benjamín Galemiri
 Cielo falso (1998) de Benjamín Galemiri.
 Poeta en Nueva York (1998) performance, homenaje a García Lorca
 EI Seductor (1997) de Benjamín Galemiri
 Un dulce aire canalla (1995) de Benjamín Galemiri
 El Solitario (1994) de Benjamín Galemiri
 EI Coordinador (1993) de Benjamín Galemiri
 Chilena Dignidad (1993) performance
 Drácula (1992)
 Performance Museo de Bellas Artes de Santiago (1992)
 Antígona (1991) espectáculo multimedia con la participación del grupo de rock Los Prisioneros
 Teorema (1987) performance
 Cleopatras (1987–1990) espectáculo multimedial

References

1964 births
Living people
Chilean film actresses
Chilean television actresses
Chilean telenovela actresses
Actresses from Santiago
University of Chile alumni
20th-century Chilean actresses
21st-century Chilean actresses
Cultural attachés
Chilean actor-politicians